Fairview is an unincorporated community in Jones County, Iowa, United States. Fairview is north of the junction of U.S. Route 151 and Iowa Highway 1 and is southwest of Anamosa.

History
The village of Fairview was laid out in 1841. Fairview's population was 26 in 1902.

Education 
Anamosa Community School District operates local area public schools.

References

Unincorporated communities in Jones County, Iowa
Unincorporated communities in Iowa